Carlos Couto (born 10 February 1930) is a Brazilian fencer. He competed in the individual and team épée events at the 1968 Summer Olympics.

References

External links
 

1930 births
Possibly living people
Brazilian male épée fencers
Olympic fencers of Brazil
Fencers at the 1968 Summer Olympics
Sportspeople from Rio de Janeiro (state)
Pan American Games medalists in fencing
Pan American Games silver medalists for Brazil
Fencers at the 1963 Pan American Games
20th-century Brazilian people